The Grand Wazoo is the eighth studio album by Frank Zappa and The Mothers, released in November 1972. It was written and recorded during Zappa's period of convalescence after being assaulted in December 1971 in London, UK.

Overview
Along with its predecessor Waka/Jawaka (July 1972), this album represents Zappa's foray into big band music, the logical progression from Hot Rats (1969) (which used a much smaller lineup). This was the last release on Zappa's own Bizarre Records label.

Recording and production
This was the second Zappa album released in a period where he needed to use a wheelchair. Zappa was unable to tour after being assaulted and pushed offstage into an orchestra pit during a concert on December 10, 1971, at the Rainbow Theatre in London, UK.

The album is mostly made up of instrumental pieces, similar in style to those of three previous albums: Hot Rats (October 1969), Burnt Weeny Sandwich (February 1970), and Waka/Jawaka (July 1972).

Track listing
All songs written, composed and arranged by Frank Zappa.

Personnel

Musicians

 "The Grand Wazoo" and "For Calvin (And His Next Two Hitch-Hikers)"

 Mike Altschul - woodwind
 Billy Byers - trombone (including solo on "The Grand Wazoo")
 Joanna Caldwell - woodwind
 Earl Dumler - woodwind
 Aynsley Dunbar - drums
 Tony Duran - guitar (including bottleneck guitar solo on "The Grand Wazoo")
 Erroneous (Alex Dmochowski) - bass
 Alan Estes - percussion
 Fred Jackson - woodwind
 Sal Marquez - vocals, trumpet (including solo on "The Grand Wazoo")
 Malcolm McNab - brass
 Janet Neville-Ferguson – vocals
 Tony "Bat Man" Ortega - woodwind
 Don Preston - minimoog (including solo on "The Grand Wazoo")
 Johnny Rotella - woodwind
 Ken Shroyer - brass, "contractor and spiritual guidance"
 Ernie Tack - brass
 Frank Zappa - guitar (including opening solo on "The Grand Wazoo")
 Bob Zimmitti - percussion

 "Cletus Awreetus-Awrightus"

 Mike Altschul - woodwind
 "Chunky" (Lauren Wood) - vocals
 George Duke - keyboards, vocals
 Erroneous (Alex Dmochowski) - bass
 Aynsley Dunbar - drums
 Sal Marquez - brass
 Ken Shroyer - trombones
 Frank Zappa - vocals, guitar
with:
 Ernie Watts - C Melody Saxophone (the "Mystery Horn") solo

 "Eat That Question"

 Mike Altschul - woodwind
 George Duke - keyboards
 Aynsley Dunbar - drums
 Erroneous (Alex Dmochowski) - bass
 Sal Marquez - "multiple toots" (brass)
 Joel Peskin - woodwind
 Frank Zappa - guitar, percussion
with:
 Lee Clement - gong

 "Blessed Relief"

 Mike Altschul - woodwind
 George Duke - keyboards
 Aynsley Dunbar - drums
 Tony Duran - rhythm guitar
 Erroneous (Alex Dmochowski) - bass
 Sal Marquez - brass
 Joel Peskin - woodwind
 Frank Zappa - lead guitar

Production
Producer: Frank Zappa
Engineer: Kerry McNabb
Arranger: Frank Zappa
Special assistance: Paul Hof
Photography: Ed Caraeff, Tony Esparza, Barry Feinstein
Cover illustration: Cal Schenkel
Art direction: Frank Zappa
Spiritual advisor: Kenny Shroyer
Contractor: Kenny Shroyer
Burritos: Ernie's Taco House
Pizza: two guys from Italy
Barbecue desiccated chicken: Hollywood Ranch Market

Notes

References
 Musicians and production per CD booklet.

External links
Lyrics and information
Release details

1972 albums
Albums produced by Frank Zappa
Frank Zappa albums
Jazz fusion albums by American artists
Reprise Records albums